Ecaterinovca is a commune in Cimișlia District, Moldova. It is composed of two villages, Coștangalia and Ecaterinovca.

References

Communes of Cimișlia District